Akkuş is a town and a district of Ordu Province in the Black Sea region of Turkey. According to the 2000 census, population of the district is 49,799 of which 8,768 live in the town of Akkuş.

Geography
Akkuş is in the foothills of Mount Argan in the Canik range inland from the Black Sea coast. Two rivers, the Tifi and the Karakuş are formed from streams running down from these mountains. The climate is typical of high pasture country, the district is under snow for four to five months of the year, and fog and rain for the remainder. The summer sun occasionally shines and when it does the lush green countryside is beautiful. The area could attract visitors on trekking or winter sports vacations but lacks the infrastructure for this at the moment. The local economy depends on farming, forestry and grazing livestock plus some handicrafts including carpet weaving.

History
Formerly known as Karakuş, the area was once part of the Kingdom of Pontus. The first Turkish rulers were the Danishmend and Hacıemiroğlu Anatolian beyliks and then from the 15th century the Ottoman Empire.

Villages
The villages of Akkuş district include Alanköy, Ambargürgen, Ceyhanlı, Çaldere, Çamlıca, Çavdar, Çökek, Çukurköy, Dağyolu, Damyeri, Düğencili, Esentepe, Gedikli, Gökçebayır, Gürgenliyatak, Haliluşağı, Karaçal, Kargı, Kemikgeriş, Ketendere, Koçcuvaz, Kurtboğaz, Kuşçulu, Külekçili, Meyvalı, Muratlı, Ormancık, Ortabölme, Şahin, Tuzakköy, Yeniköy, Yeşilgüneycik, Yeşilköy, Yolbaşı, and Yukarıdüğencili Köyü.

Image gallery

Notes

References

External links

  District governor's official website
  Local information website
 Road map of Akkuş and environs
 Various images of Akkuş, Ordu
 Current Akkus photos Akkuş, Ordu

Populated places in Ordu Province
Districts of Ordu Province